Nostalgic is the characteristic of having or feeling nostalgia.

Nostalgic may also refer to:

 "Nostalgic" (song), a 2015 song by Kelly Clarkson
 "Nostalgic", a 2016 song by Simple Plan from Taking One for the Team
 "Nostalgic", a 2019 song by Arizona